Mons Delisle is a mountain on the Moon, located on the edge of Mare Imbrium west of the crater Delisle. The mountain was named after the nearby crater of the same name by the IAU in 1985.

References

External links
 LAC-39 area - Map

Mountains on the Moon